Ally Donaldson (born 27 November 1943) is a Scottish former footballer who played for Tynecastle, Dundee, Falkirk, Hibernian and Raith Rovers, as a goalkeeper.

References

1943 births
Living people
Scottish footballers
Tynecastle F.C. players
Dundee F.C. players
Falkirk F.C. players
Hibernian F.C. players
Raith Rovers F.C. players
Scottish Football League players
Association football goalkeepers
Scotland under-23 international footballers
Scottish Football League representative players
Footballers from Edinburgh